"Gina" is a song written by Leon Carr and Paul Vance.

Background
The song first appeared in an episode of the CBS television series Diagnosis: Unknown. It was subsequently recorded in 1960 by a vocalist named Johnny Janis (1928-2017). Arranged and conducted by Glenn Osser, "Gina" was released as a single that year by Columbia Records (catalogue no. 4-41797). It did not chart.

Johnny Mathis recording
In 1962, Johnny Mathis recorded his version of "Gina". Produced by Ernie Altschuler, and arranged by Don Costa, it was also released by Columbia (catalogue no. 4-42582). This time, it became a hugely successful hit, peaking at #2 on the U.S. adult contemporary chart, #6 on the U.S. pop chart, and #8 on the Cashbox chart.

References

External links
 

1962 songs
1962 singles
1963 singles
Songs with music by Leon Carr
Songs written by Paul Vance
Johnny Mathis songs
The Casinos songs
Columbia Records singles
Liberty Records singles